Lieutenant-General Sir Travers Edward Clarke  (6 April 1871 – 2 February 1962) was a British Army officer who served in the South African War and the First World War. During the First World War, he held various staff positions; he was Quartermaster-General to the Armies in France from 1917 to 1921, when he became Quartermaster-General to the Forces.

Military career
Clarke attended the Royal Military College, Sandhurst, and was commissioned as a second lieutenant into the Royal Inniskilling Fusiliers on 29 October 1890. He was promoted to lieutenant on 20 July 1892, and served with his regiment on the North West Frontier of India and in the Tirah Expedition of 1897-98, following which he was promoted to captain on 13 April 1898. Later the same year he was appointed adjutant of the 2nd battalion of his regiment on 31 October 1898, serving until 31 October 1902. During these years, his battalion saw active service in the Second Boer War in South Africa from 1900 to 1902. After peace was declared in June 1902, he left Cape Town to arrive in the United Kingdom the following month. For his service in South Africa, he received the Queen's South Africa Medal with four clasps.

In 1911, he married Mary Jordan, daughter of Sir John Jordan, the British ambassador to China. The couple had one son, John Walrond Edward Clarke (1913-1987) of Clough, Co. Down before Mary's death in the outbreak of Spanish flu in 1918. He remarried in 1921, to Irene Roe (née Cross), the widow of an officer in the Iniskillings. By his second marriage, he had two sons, one of whom was killed on active service in 1944.

He served in World War I as Quartermaster-General for the British Armies in France from 1917. In this role he was responsible for transferring Allied prisoners of war back to the United Kingdom and he strove to ensure they were treated properly and given clothing and blankets as they returned from Germany. After the War he became Quartermaster-General to the Forces; he retired in 1926. From 1923 to 1941 he was the ceremonial colonel of the Royal Inniskilling Fusiliers.

He was also Deputy Chairman of the British Empire Exhibition in 1924.

Notes

References
"CLARKE, Lieut-Gen. Sir Travers (Edwards)", in 

 

|-

1871 births
1962 deaths
British Army lieutenant generals
Graduates of the Royal Military College, Sandhurst
British Army generals of World War I
Knights Grand Cross of the Order of the British Empire
Knights Commander of the Order of the Bath
Knights Commander of the Order of St Michael and St George
Royal Inniskilling Fusiliers officers
British Army personnel of the Second Boer War